The 2009 Copa de España de Fútbol Sala is the 20th staging of the Copa de España de Fútbol Sala. It was held in the Palacio Municipal de Deportes de Granada, in Granada, Spain, between 26 February and 1 March 2009.

Qualified teams

Final tournament

Knockout stage

Quarter-finals

Semi-finals

Final

Top goalscorers

References

External links
 LNFS website

Copa de España de Futsal seasons
Espana
Futsal